Palakkad railway division (formerly Olavakkod railway division) is one of the six administrative divisions of the Southern Railway zone of Indian Railways. It is headquartered at city of Palakkad, Kerala. It is the smallest railway division in Southern Railway. It was formed by dissolving the Podanur division. Managing 588 route kilometers of track in the states of Kerala, Tamil Nadu, Karnataka and Mahé (in the Union Territory of Puducherry), it is one of the oldest railway divisions in India.
The terminal facility of Palakkad division is situated in Shoranur Junction & Mangalore Central of Karnataka state.

History 
Hon'ble Dupty Railway Minister Shri Alagesan announce in parliament "It has been decided to introduce the divisional system on the Southern Railway too, and there will be one headquarter in the Kerala area in which the hon. Member is interested, and that will be at Olavakot. What is today the Palakkad railway division was formed on 31 August 1956 as the fifth division of the Southern Railway, the first Railway Zone of the newly formed Indian Railways It was named Olavakkod railway division at the time because it was headquartered at the railway junction situated at Olavakkod near Palakkad, which was later renamed to Palakkad Junction. At the time of its formation, it managed the broad-gauge trunk line from Jolarpet in Vellore district, Tamil Nadu to Mangalore in Karnataka via Coimbatore and Shoranur, including the Nilgiri Mountain Railway, the Shoranur–Cochin Harbor Terminus line and the Shoranur–Nilambur Road branch line, giving it a total of 1,247 km of route kilometers. In 1979, the Shoranur–CHTS line was delinked to create the new Thiruvananthapuram railway division, reducing trackage of the division to 1132 km. Most of Palakkad division was made double track in the three following decades. In 2007, the Palakkad division was cut in half as 623 km of route track from Jolarpettai to Podanur, including the Coimbatore region and the NMR were removed from Palakkad division to create the Salem division, reducing its route kilometers to 577. At this time 79 km of Meter Gauge track of the Palakkad Town - Pollachi and Pollachi - Podanur lines were granted to Palakkad as a consolation, making its total trackage to 588 km.

Timeline 
 1956: Podanur division was dissolved and Palakkad Division formed under the name Olavakkod railway division
 1976: Entire stretch from Jolarpettai to Irugur is double track.
 1979: Shoranur–Ernakulam line is handed over the Thiruvananthapuram division.
 1984: Palakkad–Shornur doubling completed.
 1991: Tiruppatur–Salem line electrified.
 1992: Salem–Erode line electrified.
 1994: Twin single lines (effectively double) between Podanur and Palghat opened.
 1995: Palakkad–Shoranur line electrified.
 1996: Erode–Palakkad line electrified.
 1997: Palakkad Jn–Palakkad Town line electrified
 2000, ‘X’ class Meter Gauge locomotives were rebuilt and successfully run on Nilgiri Mountain Railway
 2007: Palakkad loses more than half of its trackage to the newly formed Salem division.
 2014: Entire line stretch from Shoranur to Mangalore is double track.
 2016: Gauge conversion of the Palakkad–Pollachi line completed.
 2017: Shoranur–Mangalore line Electrified

Area covered

The Palakkad division starts just after Podanur Junction and proceeds westwards towards Kerala. The double track line splits into two single track sections widely spaced apart after the Ettimadai station and pass through the jungles of the Palakkad Gap. The two tracks briefly reunite at the Walayar station, and then again split to join at Kanjikode. At Palakkad junction, the track to Palakkad Town and Pollachi branch off to the left. The main line continues onwards to Shoranur and the division jurisdiction ends just after the bridge across the Bharathappuzha. Two single lines connect Shoranur Junction to this mainline. From Shoranur the branch line to Nilambur branches off into the teak forests on the right, while the mainline continues on north and runs past Tirur, Kozhikode, Kannur and Kasargod, and crosses the Karnataka border just before Ullal to enter the Dakshina Kannada district of Karnataka. Just after the bridge across the Netravati River, 15 kilometers from the Kerala–Karnataka border, the lines to the  terminus branch off to the left. The mainline continues past  (Kankanady) and past the Padil and  station triangles to end at the Panambur New Mangalore port and its yards and sidings.

The Mangalore area is unique for its complicated jurisdictional interchanges between zones and divisions. The Padil triangle including the station situated on the eastern side of the triangle come wholly under SR/PGT, and the South Western Railway (Mysore division) starts just a couple of meters after the Padil station and continues on eastwards towards Hassan and Mysore as the MHRDL line. Just a few kilometers north of Padil lies the Thokur triangle, which is again the interchange point between the Konkan Railway and the Southern Railway, but the southern line of the triangle belongs to SR/PGT while the two connecting lines to Konkan Railway. Palakkad division's northernmost point of jurisdiction lies here, just short of  the Thokur station.

Stations 
The list includes the stations under the Palakkad railway division and their station category.

Stations closed for Passengers - Bharathapuzha

See also
Palakkad Junction railway station
Palakkad Railway Colony
Southern Railway zone
Thiruvananthapuram railway division
Shoranur Junction railway station

References

External links

 
Southern Railway zone
1979 establishments in India
Divisions of Indian Railways